Mohamed Attia (born September 19, 1973) is an Egyptian production designer and art director who is best known for his collaborations with Marwan Hamed, Yousry Nasrallah, Mohamed Khan, and Tarek Alarian. He is also one of the key artistic directors behind the Pharaohs' Golden Parade and the parade that celebrated the restoration of Luxor's Avenue of Sphinxes.

He received the Egyptian National Film Festival's Best Art Design Award for his work in The Blue Elephant, the Egyptian Catholic Center For Cinema's Best Art Director Award for The Originals, the Cairo Design Award's Golden Award in the Production Design Category for Diamond Dust and Blue Elephant: Dark Whispers, and the Silver Award for his work in Sons of Rizk 2.

Education and Career

Attia studied dentistry at Cairo University for five months before deciding it wasn't his passion. He then transferred to the Faculty of Fine Arts in Zamalek, where he interned on the set of Al Mohager (The Emigrant) — a 1994 film directed by Youssef Chahine.

In 1995, he completed his architectural studies and began working as a draftsman in France. After working on drawings for over three years, he jumped at the chance to return to Cairo and help renovate buildings at the 1930s-era production complex Studio Misr. There, he met production designer and art director Salah Marei, who encouraged him to change careers and introduced him to film director Khan.

Filmography





References 

Living people
1973 births